Musultemakhi (Dargwa: МусултӀемахьи) is a rural locality (a selo) and the administrative centre of Musultemakhinsky Selsoviet, Levashinsky District, Republic of Dagestan, Russia. The population was 482 as of 2010. There are 3 streets.

Geography 
Musultemakhi is located 28 km southwest of Levashi (the district's administrative centre) by road. Kumamakhi and Allate are the nearest rural localities.

Nationalities 
Dargins live there.

References 

Rural localities in Levashinsky District